Min Joon-ki (born February 19, 1968) is a South Korean film director. He wrote and directed Heaven's Soldiers (2005), in which Halley's Comet causes North and South Korean soldiers to travel back in time from 2005 to 1572, where they join Korean national hero Yi Sun-sin in fighting the Jurchen tribes.

Filmography
Heaven's Soldiers (2005) - director, screenplay
A Man and a Woman on an Island (1992) - assistant director

References

External links

1968 births
Living people
South Korean film directors